Stephen Dixon (born 1957 in Peterlee, Co. Durham, United Kingdom) is a British ceramic artist and professor at the Manchester Metropolitan University. He is also a satirist, writer, lecturer and curator. He is known mainly for his use of dark narrative and for using "illustrated ceramics pots as an unlikely platform for social commentary and political discontent." From Renaissance paintings and British politics to pop culture, Dixon draws on a variety of sources to "challenge the status quo and inspire new ways of thinking." Dixon tends to create busy, complex ceramics pieces, each with an intriguing message.

Education and career 
After growing up in Peterlee, Dixon went on to study at the University of Newcastle-upon-Tyne, earning his BFA in 1980. He then earned his MA in Ceramics at the Royal College of Art in 1986. From 1986 to 1998, Dixon worked as a part-time visiting Lecturer in Ceramics at the Edinburgh College of Art, The London Institute, The Surrey Institute, Staffordshire University, Cork Institute of Technology, Tameside College, Manchester City College, and Berkshire College of Art and Design. After leaving this post in 1998, Dixon became a Research Fellow in Contemporary Crafts at Manchester Metropolitan University, and, in 2003, he was elevated into the Senior Research Fellow position. Currently, Dixon works as the Professor of Contemporary Crafts at the Manchester School of Art. His career has been frequented with involvement in research projects and community-focused art projects, and in 2007 he curated the exhibition 200 Years: Slavery Now for the Bluecoat Display Centre in Liverpool, England.

Artist's statements 
"I am interested in the history of clay…the unique way that ceramic relics and fragments communicate across the centuries, telling tales of great personalities and events, as well as the mundane rituals of daily life." -Stephen Dixon

"From the start I was never interested in making functional pieces, and more interested in telling stories and making statements." -Stephen Dixon

Awards 
2014 Member of the Art and Design sub-panel, Higher Education Funding Council for England Research Excellence Framework
2009-2013 Trustee of the Crafts Council(United Kingdom)
2009 British ceramic Biennial project award
2005 HAT Project/ACE International Research Fellowship
2004 Calouste Gulbenkian Foundation, exhibition award
2000 Arts Council Year of the Artist (collaborative project with Amnesty International and Kosovan refugees)

Museum collections 
Dixon's work is represented in the following museum collections:

Brighton Museum and Art Gallery, Royal Pavilion Gardens, Brighton
Manchester Art Gallery, Manchester, UK
Museum of Arts & Design, New York, NY, USA
Racine Art Museum, Racine, WI, USA
Royal Museum of Scotland, Edinburgh, UK
San Francisco Museums of Fine Arts, San Francisco, CA, USA
The British Arts Council and the Crafts Council (UK)
Victoria and Albert Museum, London, UK

Selected solo exhibitions 
2009 Travellers’ Tales, Contemporary Applied Arts, London, UK
2008 Embedded Narratives, The Loft, Mumbai, India
2005 The Sleep of Reason, Manchester Art Gallery, UK
2000 Beauty and the Beast Anatol Orient, London, UK
1998 Nancy Margolis Gallery, New York, USA
1995 Garth Clark Gallery, New York, USA

Selected group exhibitions 
Dixon has exhibited at museums and galleries of note in the United States, France, Britain, India, and Australia, including the following:

2015 The Lost Boys: Remembering the Boy Soldiers of the First World War, Holden Gallery, Manchester, UK
2014 Magic Mud: Masterworks in Clay from RAM’s Collection, Racine Art Museum, Racine WI
2013 Friendship Forged in Fire: British Ceramics in America, American Museum of Ceramic Art, Pomona, California
2013 Top 10 at 10: Favorites from RAM’s Collection, Racine Art Museum, Racine, WI
2010 Collect Saatchi Gallery, London
2010 Ahmedabad International Arts Festival, India
2009 Allegory Crafts Study Centre, Farnham
2007 The HAT Project: Here and There, The British Council, New Delhi
2006 Surface Tension, the Jam Factory, Adelaide, Australia
2006 Ceramique Contemporaine Biennale Internationale, Vallauris, France
2005 Figuring Narratives, Glynn Vivian Art gallery, Swansea
2004 Go Figure, Clay Gallery, Venice, California
2003 Tea, Anyone?,  Racine Art Museum, Racine, Wisconsin
2002 Containing Ceramics: Highlights from the Crafts Council Collection, SOFA Chicago
2002 16/16, The Scottish Gallery, Edinburgh
2000 The Times of Our Lives, Endings Whitworth Art Gallery, Manchester

References

Studio pottery
1957 births
Living people
People associated with Cork Institute of Technology